Sacha Perry (born May 1, 1970) is an American jazz pianist, composer and pedagogue.

Education and career
Sacha Perry is an exponent of the bebop and hard bop styles, which he learned as a protégé of Barry Harris and Frank Hewitt, and he particularly carries the tradition of vernacular musicians Bud Powell, Elmo Hope, Thelonious Monk and Herbie Nichols. Perry appears regularly at Smalls Jazz Club in New York, the record label of which releases his albums featuring his compositions. He has worked closely with Aaron Johnson, Teddy Charles and Bob Mover, among other jazz musicians.

As teacher
Sacha Perry has taught piano at Jazz Futures in Nicosia and in New York.

Discography

As leader
 Eretics (Smalls, 2005)
 Not Brand X (Smalls, 2007)
 Third Time Around (Smalls, 2007)

As sideman
 Chris Byars, Photos in Black, White and Gray (Smalls, 2007)
 Zaid Nasser, Escape From New York (Smalls, 2007)
 Zaid Nasser, Off Minor (Smalls, 2008)

References

Notes

Citations

External links
 Sacha Perry discography at Discogs
 Sacha Perry at AllMusic
 SmallsLIVE Foundation, Sacha Perry, 2007–present

1970 births
American jazz pianists
20th-century African-American musicians
20th-century American keyboardists
21st-century African-American musicians
21st-century American composers
21st-century American keyboardists
21st-century jazz composers
African-American jazz pianists
Living people
American jazz composers